The Tulip Creek Formation is a geologic formation in Oklahoma. It preserves fossils dating back to the Ordovician period.

See also

 List of fossiliferous stratigraphic units in Oklahoma
 Paleontology in Oklahoma

References
 

Ordovician geology of Oklahoma
Ordovician southern paleotropical deposits